I cuori infranti ( The Broken Hearts) is a 1963 Italian comedy film directed by Vittorio Caprioli and Gianni Puccini. It was shown as part of a retrospective on Italian comedy at the 67th Venice International Film Festival.

Cast

Segment E vissero felici
 Norma Bengell as Milena
 Gianni Bonagura as Un bagnante
 Sandro Bruni
 Nino Manfredi as Quirino
 Roberto Paoletti as L'ex commilitone di Quirino
 Ilya Lopez as faithless wife of Quirino's commilitone

Segment La manina di Fatma
 Tino Buazzelli as Gustavo Von Tellen
 Vittorio Caprioli as Un passante
 Aldo Giuffrè as Carlo De Tomasi
 Dany París as La ragazza del tiro a segno
 Paola Quattrini as Lisa Von Tellen
 Linda Sini as Baronessa Von Tellen
 Franca Valeri as Fatma Angioj

References

External links

1963 films
1963 comedy films
Italian comedy films
1960s Italian-language films
Commedia all'italiana
Italian black-and-white films
Films set in Rome
Films shot in Rome
Films directed by Gianni Puccini
Films directed by Vittorio Caprioli
Films scored by Fiorenzo Carpi
1960s Italian films